Out on Blue Six was a weekly hour-long radio show broadcast by BBC Radio One on Monday evenings between 1991 and 1993 and presented by Mark Radcliffe. 

The music played on the show was mostly garage, psychedelia or punk. The show received a Sony Award in 1992 for Best Specialist Music Programme.

References 

BBC Radio 1 programmes